Jean-François Morin-Roberge (born January 9, 1984) is a former offensive lineman who played in the Canadian Football League. He was drafted by the Saskatchewan Roughriders in the fourth round of the 2008 CFL Draft. He played CIS Football at Montreal.

Morin-Roberge also with the Winnipeg Blue Bombers for their 2009 pre-season training camp, but was cut by the team at the camp's conclusion.  On October 19, 2009, Morin-Roberge was signed by the Toronto Argonauts to practice roster agreement. He was released by the Argonauts on November 8, 2009, but was re-signed by the team on January 15, 2010. On April 19, 2010, Morin-Roberge retired from football.

External links
Saskatchewan Roughriders bio

1984 births
Canadian football offensive linemen
French Quebecers
Living people
Montreal Carabins football players
Players of Canadian football from Quebec
Sportspeople from Quebec City
Winnipeg Blue Bombers players